Rushing River is  southeast of Kenora. The park has predominantly glacial features. The Park features swimming, boating, canoe, kayak and stand up paddle board rentals, as well as fishing, hiking, and camping including electrical and non electrical sites.

References

External links
 

Provincial parks of Ontario
Protected areas established in 1958
1958 establishments in Ontario